It's in There… And It's Got To Come Out! is singer Kate Taylor's third album, released in 1979.

It's in There failed to reach its public. After this release Taylor took a break from the music industry for the next two decades, during which time she appeared sporadically as a performer and back-up singer for various other artists, not releasing another album herself until 2003.

Track listing
 "I Got the Will" — (Otis Redding)
 "Kite Woman" — (J.D. Souther)
 "Ain't No Way to Forget You" — (W.C. Quillen, Grady L. Smith)
 "Loving You Was Easier" — (Kris Kristofferson)
 "Ain't Too Proud to Beg" — (Edward Holland, Jr., Norman Whitfield)
 "It's the Same Old Song" — (Holland-Dozier-Holland)
 "Can't Hurry Love" — (Holland-Dozier-Holland)
 "I'm a Hog for You Baby" — (Jerry Leiber, Mike Stoller)
 "Champagne and Wine" — (Roy Johnson, Otis Redding, Allan Walden)
 "Ain't No Love in the Heart of the City" — (Michael Price, Dan Walsh)

Personnel
 Kate Taylor – vocals 
 Barry Beckett — piano 
 Larry Byrom — acoustic guitar, electric guitar 
 Pete Carr — electric guitar 
 Gregg Hamm – engineer 
 Roger Hawkins — drums 
 David Hood — bass 
 Jimmy Johnson — electric guitar 
 Randy McCormick – organ 
 Charlie McCoy — harmonica 
 Weldon Myrick — steel guitar 
 Cindy Richardson – backing vocals 
 Tom Roady – percussion 
 David Sanborn — alto saxophone 
 Alex Taylor — backing vocals 
 Hugh Taylor – backing vocals 
 Livingston Taylor — backing vocals 
 Marle Tomlinson – backing vocals

1979 albums
Kate Taylor albums
Albums produced by Barry Beckett
CBS Records albums